Ferreola is a genus of wasps belonging to the family Pompilidae.

The genus has almost cosmopolitan distribution.

Species:
 Ferreola algira Lepeletier, 1845
 Ferreola auranticornis Wahis, 2000

References

Pompilidae
Hymenoptera genera